Hellvik Station is a railway station located in the village of Hellvik in Eigersund municipality in Rogaland county, Norway. It is served by the Jæren Commuter Rail which runs between Stavanger and Egersund. The station was opened in 1879, one year after the Jæren Line.

Gallery

References

External links

Railway stations on the Sørlandet Line
Railway stations in Rogaland
Railway stations opened in 1878
1878 establishments in Norway
Eigersund